Terry Kelly was the captain of Derry City F.C. in 1985. He is noted for being the first football player in the world to captain the same team for whom he played in two different national leagues. Kelly founded the Derry and District League team Don Bosco's F.C.

References

League of Ireland players
Living people
Association footballers from Northern Ireland
Association footballers not categorized by position
Year of birth missing (living people)
Derry City F.C. players